Tahdiya is Arabic (تهدئة) for "calming" or "quieting".

The term has been applied to a temporary lull between the Israeli forces and the  Palestinian Hamas, beginning early in 2004 following the non successful discussions to sign a Hudna, or temporary armistice. While Hudna is a term for temporary armistice, it should not be confused with tahdiya, which stands for calming down on hostilities but not a complete stop to them.

See also
Aman (Islam) or amān, assurance of security or clemency granted to enemies who seek protection
Futuwwa, concept of moral behavior similar to Western chivalry in the medieval Arab and Muslim world
Hudna, truce or armistice in Islam
List of Islamic terms in Arabic
Sulh, Arabic word meaning "resolution" or "fixing" generally, frequently used in the context of social problems

Israeli–Palestinian peace process
Arabic words and phrases